General Andersen may refer to:

James Roy Andersen (1904–1945), U.S. Army Air Forces brigadier general
Kurt Andersen (general) (1898–2003), Nazi Germany Luftwaffe general
Roy Andersen (South Africa) (born 1948) South African Army major general

See also
General Anderson (disambiguation)